The Cannone da 75/46 C.A. modello 34 was a mobile Italian anti-aircraft gun used during World War II. The designation means it had a caliber of 75 mm, the barrel was 46 caliber-lengths long and it was accepted in service in 1934.

History 
The gun shows the influence of contemporary Vickers designs such as the Model 1931, and was a sound and orthodox design. As production was both late in starting and slow in being carried out, by 1942 only 226 of the 240 ordered had been delivered. This meant that older, obsolete AA guns had to be kept in service even though their efficacy was minimal, and also that its production continued in parallel with the newer and better performing Cannone da 90/53. In addition to the mobile modello 34 a static mount the Cannone da 75/46 C.A. modello 40 was produced. Production of the model was also slow and only 45 of the 240 ordered were delivered.

Assigned both to field units and to batteries protecting the Italian territory, it was also used on the Eastern front and in the Tunisian Campaign as an anti-tank gun (in which capacity it was also fitted to the Semovente da 75/46 self-propelled gun). Its performance was considered good in both roles, especially in the latter, with its AP shell that could pierce  of armor at ), but it was never available in numbers.

After the Italian Armistice, the Wehrmacht captured some of these guns, and employed them with the designation 7.5 cm Flak 264/3(i), while modello 40 guns were given the designation 7.5 cm Flak 264/4(i)

See also 
 Italian Army equipment in World War II
 Cannone da 90/53 - another contemporary Italian anti-aircraft gun

References

Bibliography

 Artillery by Chris Chant, published by Amber Books, 
 The Encyclopedia of Weapons of World War II, Barnes and Noble Ltd. (1998), 

World War II artillery of Italy
World War II anti-aircraft guns
Anti-aircraft guns of Italy
75 mm artillery
Gio. Ansaldo & C. artillery
Military equipment introduced in the 1930s